Kirillawala is a developing city in Sri Lanka, 22 km from Colombo city centre on Colombo-Kandy A1 motorway. An Iconic gigantic Buddha statue has been built at the nearby temple facing a junction known as the " Kandakapapu Handiya". Kirillawala-Colombo bus route number 138/1 operates from this junction. Landmarks and facilities include a traffic light system, a fuel station, well known Laknara Wedding and Conference Centre, Water Corridor Pvt Ltd (Strategic Investments & Leisure Destinations) Sathosa, People's Bank, HNB and Sampath bank ATM facilities etc.

References
Mahara Pradeshiya Sabha ( Western Province Local Council) downlink edition

http://www.mahara.ds.gov.lk/index.php?option=com_content&view=article&id=35&Itemid=71&lang=en

Populated places in Sri Lanka